Aquaman is a Filmation animated series that premiered on CBS on September 9, 1967, and ended June 1970. It is a 30-minute version of The Superman/Aquaman Hour of Adventure, repackaged without the Superman and Superboy segments.

The show is composed of previously aired adventures featuring the DC Comics superheroes Aquaman (voiced by Marvin Miller) and his sidekick Aqualad (voiced by Jerry Dexter). There were also segments featuring the Atom, the Flash and Kid Flash, the Green Lantern and Hawkman, as well as team-ups with the Justice League of America and Teen Titans. The series was narrated by Ted Knight, with Marvin Miller voicing most of the villains.

Aquaman's wife Mera also appeared occasionally. Aquaman rode his seahorse Storm, and Aqualad was accompanied by a sea pony, Imp, and his pet, Tusky.

Episodes

Thirty-six Aquaman segments were produced for The Superman/Aquaman Hour of Adventure, plus 18 segments featuring other superheroes.

Home video

In recent years, Aquaman episodes have been seen as part of Cartoon Network's Boomerang. In 1985, Warner Home Video released eight selected Aquaman episodes of the series on VHS in the "Super Powers" video collection along with Batman, Superboy and Superman. These videos were rereleased in 1996 and are now out of production. On October 23, 2007, Warner Home Video (via DC Entertainment and Warner Bros. Family Entertainment) released The Adventures of Aquaman: The Complete Collection on DVD in Region 1; the 2-disc set features all 36 Aquaman segments from the series and was presented in its original, uncut broadcast presentation and original airdate order, as well as special features, including a retrospective featurette titled Aquaman: The Sovereign of the Seas, which explores Aquaman's depiction in various media and how his character and superheroic capabilities have progressed over the years.

References

External links
 Aquaman at the Big Cartoon DataBase
 

1967 American television series debuts
1970 American television series endings
1960s American animated television series
1970s American animated television series
CBS original programming
Animated television shows based on DC Comics
DC Comics animated television series by Filmation
Aquaman in other media
English-language television shows
American children's animated action television series
American children's animated adventure television series
American children's animated superhero television series